Ilona Vörösmarty (2 May 1846 – 13 December 1910) was a Hungarian noblewoman, the second child and the daughter of poet Mihály Vörösmarty and his wife, Laura Csajághy.

Family
Her brother was Béla Vörösmarty. After her father's death in 1855, she was raised by Ferenc Deák. She married Kálmán Széll on 16 September 1867. Széll later became Prime Minister of Hungary. They had a daughter, named Ilona.

Sources
Magyar családtörténeti adattár

1846 births
1910 deaths
Hungarian nobility
People from Pest, Hungary